The spectacled dormouse or namtap (Graphiurus ocularis) is a species of rodent in the family Gliridae, and one of four dormouse species endemic to South Africa.

It has a bushy, squirrel-like tail, a fairly short muzzle, small ears and soft fur.  Its face is marked with white and grey, with dark rings (spectacles) around its eyes. Its cheeks, underparts and the upper surfaces of its paws are white. Its tail is also usually tipped with white.

Its distribution is restricted to the Cederberg in western South Africa, and it is associated with rocky habitats, as well as trees and outbuildings. It is nocturnal and an agile climber. Its diet consists primarily of seeds, other plant material and invertebrates. They have been remarked to eat certain types of scorpions as well and will kill other mice or smaller rat species in their territory.

References
Stuart C. & Stuart T. 2001. Field Guide to Mammals of Southern Africa. p. 92. Struik Publishers, Cape Town.
 Coetzee, N., Griffin, M. & Grubb, P. 2004.  Graphiurus ocularis.   2006 IUCN Red List of Threatened Species.   Downloaded on 29 July 2007.
Holden, M. E.. 2005. Family Gliridae. pp. 819–841 in Mammal Species of the World a Taxonomic and Geographic Reference. D. E. Wilson and D. M. Reeder eds. Johns Hopkins University Press, Baltimore.

Endemic fauna of South Africa
Graphiurus
Mammals of South Africa
Mammals described in 1829
Taxonomy articles created by Polbot